Diego Tristán Herrera (born 5 January 1976) is a Spanish former professional footballer who played as a striker. 

At his peak, he was considered amongst the best players in his position in Europe, displaying a vast array of skills: dribbling, shot accuracy, aerial ability and off-the-ball movements. He was best known for his Deportivo de La Coruña spell, where he spent six years, often overshadowed by physical and personal problems.

Over eight La Liga seasons, Tristán amassed totals of 227 matches and 95 goals. He appeared with the Spain national  team at the 2002 World Cup.

Club career

Early years
Born in La Algaba, Province of Seville, Tristán came through the youth ranks of local Real Betis, going on to finish his sporting development with the reserves of RCD Mallorca.

After one season in the Segunda División he made his La Liga debut in 1999–2000, scoring against CD Numancia on 12 September 1999. He ended his first top-flight campaign with 18 goals.

Deportivo

After nearly moving to league powerhouse Real Madrid in the summer of 2000, a deal barred by Lorenzo Sanz's exit from the club's presidency, Tristán joined Deportivo de La Coruña. He formed a dreaded attacking partnership – on occasions, as Depor mainly operated in a 4–5–1 formation under Javier Irureta – with Dutchman Roy Makaay.

As Makaay was first-choice in 2000–01, Tristán threatened to quit Deportivo when he found himself in and out of the side, but became an undisputed starter the following season and responded, netting 21 league goals and taking home the Pichichi Trophy, which included a hat-trick in a 5–0 win over former club Mallorca. He added six in that campaign's UEFA Champions League and five in the Copa del Rey, which his team won after beating Real Madrid at the Santiago Bernabéu Stadium, for a total of 32 goals. 

Tristán injured his ankle on international duty in 2002, losing again the starting berth to Makaay who even won the European Golden Boot for his performances. The former could not adapt to his secondary role, but still scored 19 overall goals for the Galicians during that season.

Even when Makaay left Deportivo for FC Bayern Munich, Tristán never regained his form and confidence: in the 2003–04 campaign he played just ten complete matches and was taken off in 20. He only produced 13 goals (eight in the league, two in the domestic cup and three in the Champions League, including one in a 8–3 away defeat to AS Monaco FC on 5 November 2003).

Journeyman
In total, Tristán scored 111 goals in a Deportivo shirt, leaving in July 2006 along with teammate Lionel Scaloni. After being linked with several clubs in Spain and overseas, including Bolton Wanderers, he agreed to rejoin Mallorca after a six-year hiatus. He left in June 2007, having featured rarely for the Gregorio Manzano-led side.

Tristán signed a one-year contract with Serie A's A.S. Livorno Calcio in July 2007, as the Italians searched for a replacement for FC Shakhtar Donetsk-bound Cristiano Lucarelli. He failed to impress during his stint in Tuscany, scoring only once during the campaign and eventually dropping down to the Serie B.

On 29 September 2008, it was confirmed Tristán was undergoing a trial at West Ham United of the Premier League. On 14 October he agreed to a deal, making his debut on 8 December as a late substitute in the 0–2 home defeat against Tottenham Hotspur. He scored his first goal for the club in the 2–1 home victory over Stoke City later that month, also coming from the bench.

Cádiz
On 24 July 2009, Tristán joined second division club Cádiz CF after having been released by West Ham at the end of the season, thus returning to his native Andalusia after 14 years. He regained some of his scoring form in his only season, but his team was relegated after finishing in 19th position; although he himself grabbed a brace in the last league match, a 4–2 home win against Numancia on 19 June 2010, it eventually proved insufficient.

International career
On 2 June 2001, courtesy of his stellar Deportivo performances, Tristán earned a debut for Spain, scoring in a 4–1 home win against Bosnia and Herzegovina in a 2002 FIFA World Cup qualifier in Oviedo. In the finals in South Korea and Japan he appeared sparingly for the quarter-finalists after picking up an injury, and did not manage to find the net.

Tristán scored on the last of his 15 caps, a 3–0 friendly victory in Portugal on 6 September 2003.

Career statistics

Club

International

Scores and results list Spain's goal tally first, score column indicates score after each Tristán goal.

Honours
Deportivo
Copa del Rey: 2001–02
Supercopa de España: 2000

Individual
Pichichi Trophy: 2001–02

References

External links

Stats and bio at Cadistas1910 

1976 births
Living people
People from Vega del Guadalquivir
Sportspeople from the Province of Seville
Spanish footballers
Footballers from Andalusia
Association football forwards
La Liga players
Segunda División players
Segunda División B players
Betis Deportivo Balompié footballers
RCD Mallorca B players
RCD Mallorca players
Deportivo de La Coruña players
Cádiz CF players
Serie A players
U.S. Livorno 1915 players
Premier League players
West Ham United F.C. players
Spain international footballers
2002 FIFA World Cup players
Spanish expatriate footballers
Expatriate footballers in Italy
Expatriate footballers in England
Spanish expatriate sportspeople in Italy
Spanish expatriate sportspeople in England
Pichichi Trophy winners